The Special Honours Lists for Australia are announced by the Sovereign and Governor-General at any time.

Some honours are awarded by other countries where Queen Elizabeth II is the Head of State and Australians receiving those honours are listed here with the relevant reference.

This list also incorporates the Mid Winters Day honours list and the Bravery honours list's.

Victoria Cross for Australia (VC)

 The late Ordinary Seaman Edward Sheean - 12 August 2020

Order of Australia

Officer (AO)
Honorary Military
 Admiral Robert P. Burke, United States – 24 August 2020 – For distinguished service in strengthening the military alliance between Australia and the United States of America.

Member (AM)
Honorary General
 Professor Massimo Colomban, Italy – 28 January 2020 – For significant service to the Australian Government as Honorary Consul in Veneto, Italy.
 Count Paolo Zegna Di Monte Rubello, Italy – 28 January 2020 – For significant service to Australia's bilateral relationship with Italy and to the Australian wool industry.

Medal (OAM)
Honorary General
  Sir Christopher John Benson,  –  United Kingdom – 28 January 2020 – For service to the bilateral relationship between Australia and the United Kingdom.
 Valerie Hooper – Belgium – 28 January 2020 – For service to the Embassy of Australia to Belgium and Luxembourg, and Australia's Mission to the European Union and NATO.

Star of Courage (SC)

 Paul Robert Chaplin - For acts of conspicuous courage in circumstances of great peril
 Ruth Mawi Dhurrkay - Miss Ruth Dhurrkay displayed conspicuous courage during a violent attack on a young girl at Galiwinku in the Northern Territory on 30 October 2018.

Bar to the Bravery Medal (BM and Bar)

 Stevan John Morrow - Mr Stevan Morrow displayed considerable bravery during an armed hold-up at a jewellery shop in Toorak in Victoria on 14 January 2017.

Bravery Medal (BM)

 Troy Daniel Cutler
 Natalie Jane Dearden
 Darren Charles Fyfe
 Sergeant Mark Hilton Hevers - New South Wales Police Force
 Matthew James Irving
 Timothy Brett Kelm
 Sergeant Justin McEvoy - New South Wales Police Force
 Regan Angus McMahon
 Senior Sergeant Bradyn Michael Murphy,  - Queensland Police Service
 Anthony Gordon Northbrooke-Hine
 David Howard O'Dowd
 Kyle Anthony Patrech
 Senior Constable Ashley Cain Rawlings - Victoria Police
 Donald Allen Romey
 Levi John Symington
 John Ngahiti Waerea
 Constable Matthew John Woodham - Queensland Police Service
 Mark Timothy Bryant
 Zebulon Albert Critchlow
 Joshua Allan Downes
 Billy James Eitz
 The late Mr Callum James Hall
 Robert Hayden
 Tyler Oswald Hollmer-Cross
 Senior Constable Michael Hoogvelt
 Jonathon Athol Hyde
 William Brett Moller
 Stevan John Morrow - Mr Stevan Morrow displayed considerable bravery during an armed hold-up at a jewellery shop in Toorak in Victoria on 25 October 2016.
 Troy Steven Oakley
 Terrence Anthony Townsend

Australian Antarctic Medal (AAM)

 Simon Cross - For service to the Australian Antarctic Program in his capacity of a Field Training Officer involved in the 2013 medical evacuation and particularly in his role in rescuing three injured expeditioners.
 Bradley Allen Collins - For his outstanding contribution to the Australian Antarctic Program over thirteen seasons, particularly in the leadership role he took during the grounding of the Aurora Australis at Horseshoe Harbour, near Mawson Research Station, Antarctica.
 Alison Audrey Dean - For her outstanding service to the Australian Antarctic Program as a station leader who has provided exceptional leadership in building strong and resilient communities and leading teams through a number of high intensity operations.
 Leanne Mary Millhouse - For her outstanding service to the Australian Antarctic Program, particularly in her capacity as Voyage Leader on the Aurora Australis when the ship has been tasked to assist in crisis situations.
 The late Professor Patrick Gerard Quilty,  - For his outstanding contribution to Antarctic science helping to establish Australia's leading reputation in the field. 
 Dr Colin Jeffrey Southwell - For his outstanding contribution to the Australian Antarctic Program by providing important insights and breadth of knowledge for wildlife conservation and management.

Commendation for Brave Conduct

 Kurt Luther Bligh
 George Chapman
 Senior Constable Christopher James Cooper - New South Wales Police Force
 Stuart William Couch
 Senior Constable Thomas Robert Dempsey - Victoria Police
 Lee James Dobson
 Senior Constable Grant Charlton Haydon - New South Wales Police Force
 Daniel Edward Kotynia
 Benjamin Terence McKenzie
 Leading Senior Constable Mark Douglas McLean - Victoria Police
 Jamie Ronald O'Connell
 Major Brendan Andrew Rowe - Australian Army
 Senior Constable Andrew Palgrave Simpson - New South Wales Police Force
 Robin Wayne Smith
 Sergeant Craig Jason Stanton - Victoria Police
 Simon Eric Werne
 Sergeant Daniel Willsmore - Victoria Police
 Ahmed Abdullah Almohaimeed
 Cody Jay Batchelor
 Senior Constable John William Dijkstra
 Glen Aaron Hardy
 David Joyce
 Joshua James Woodley

Champion Shots Medal

Bar to the medal
 Sub Lieutenant Jerome Joseph James Dillon-Baker, 

Medal
 Flight Lieutenant Rowen Mitchell McBride
 Lance Corporal Nicholas Paul Latham

Group Bravery Citation

Awardees comprise members of the Country Fire Authority who are recognised for their actions after an armed offender set fire to a house and vehicles at Meadow Heights in Victoria.
 Brendan Colin Edwards
 Francisco Grech
 Roy William Griffiths
 Matthew David Kent

Awardees comprise an officer of the Queensland Police Service and a member of the public who are recognised for their actions during the rescue of a man from a burning vehicle at Gympie in Queensland.
 Constable Jeremy Gardiol - Queensland Police Service
 Alan Girdler

Awardees comprise five members of Fire and Rescue New South Wales and two Ambulance New South Wales paramedics who are recognised for their actions during the rescue of a man trapped in a trench at a building site in Castle Hill, New South Wales.
 Warren William Bostock
 Christopher Humphreys
 Anthony Gordon Northbrooke-Hine
 Terrence Andrew Sadoswky
 Deryck John Salfus
 Bradley Scott Turner
 Anthony Waller

Awardees comprise members of the Tactical Response Group of the Western Australian Police Force who are recognised for their actions during the apprehension of a violent offender near Fitzroy Crossing in Western Australia.
 Robert Harold Brown
 Dennis Eric Collision, 
 John Robert Dent
 Barry John Lansdown
 Donald Gordon McPherson
 The late Mr William Frederick Matson, 
 David Anthony Sheehan
 Edward William Trindall

Awardees comprise officers of the New South Wales Police Force and Queensland Police Service who are recognised for their actions during the apprehension of two armed offenders following a high-speed vehicle pursuit near Tweed Heads in New South Wales.
 Kristie Emma Bell
 Troy Daniel Cutler
 Senior Constable Brett John Burns
 Senior Constable Luke William Davies
 Senior Constable Matthew John Grinham
 Senior Constable Justin Gregory Lavin
 Senior Constable Peter Bradley Lever
 Senior Sergeant Bradyn Michael Murphy, 
 Constable Matthew Kenneth Siddall
 Senior Constable Andrew Palgrave Simpson

Awardees comprise members of the Malabar Emergency Unit who are recognised for their actions during a prison riot at Long Bay Gaol in New South Wales.
 Wayne Francis Carmandy
 Alan Gary Clarke
 William Dodson
 Anthony Stefan D'Silva
 David Shane Farrell
 David John Gilledge
 Garry William Lockhart
 Kenneth Michael Newberry
 Domenic Pezzano
 The late Mr Mark Anthony Russo
 The late Mr Stephen John Wright

Awardees comprise members of the public who are recognised for their actions during the rescue of passengers and driver following a bus crash in Lamington National Park in Queensland.
 Steven Hamish Armitage
 Senior Sergeant Troy Anthony Hamilton,  - Queensland Police Service
 Paul John Hughes - of the United Kingdom
 Dr Samantha Naday
 Jack William O'Dwyer
 Michael John Springfield

Awardees comprise five members of a group who rescued a man from a burning vehicle at Corowa, New South Wales.
 Phillip Adrian Dunning
 Rhys Jones
 Samuel Marshall King
 Daryl Brent Price
 Terrence Anthony Townsend

Awardees comprise two members of a group for their actions following a boat collision at Bradley's Head, New South Wales.
 Nasser Farache
 Samar Oweck

References

External links
Special Honours Lists, Governor General of Australia

Orders, decorations, and medals of Australia
2020 awards in Australia